Jack Franklin Allen (born September 24, 1947 in Lawton, Oklahoma) is a former American collegiate and Professional Football player. 

Allen grew up in Dallas, Texas. In 1965, he graduated from South Oak Cliff High School, where he played defensive back for their football team. He was then recruited to play college football at Baylor University.  

In 1969, Allen was drafted to play professionally by the American Football League’s  Oakland Raiders. He also played defensive back for the Buffalo Bills and Philadelphia Eagles.  

Allen retired from professional football after the 1972 season.

See also
List of American Football League players

References

1947 births
Living people
Sportspeople from Lawton, Oklahoma
American football cornerbacks
Baylor Bears football players
Oakland Raiders players
Buffalo Bills players
Philadelphia Eagles players
American Football League players